David Manyok Barac Atem  (January 1, 1959 – February 26, 2021) was a senior South Sudanese military figure. He was a Major General in South Sudan People's Defense Forces (SSPDF) formerly known as the Sudan People Liberation Army (SPLA). He contributed to the liberation struggle that birthed South Sudan.
David joined the Jamus Battalion on May 16, 1983 when fighting broke out in Bor. In January 2021, he was deployed to the SSPDF General headquarters in Bilpham by President Salva Kiir Mayardit and as the Director of Administration, Personnel and Finance by the Commander in Chief of the SSPDF Gen. Salva Kiir Mayardit. He held the position for nearly a month, until his death due to COVID-19.

Atem's family lived in Bor up until his death in February of 2021.

Military training 

In July 1983, David Manyok Barac left Bor town to join the liberation struggle in Ethiopia where SPLA/M was formed. He, by default, became one of the founders of the new organization.

In 1983, immediately after the formation of the SPLA/M, he attended the first SPLA training in Signal-Communication and Electronic Warfare (CEW) in Zinc, Gambella, Ethiopia where he specialized in decoding and graduated as a specialist in the Signal Unit. Upon this graduation from the signal unit, he was given the rank of sergeant. In 1984, he attended SPLA Institute of Revolutionary War Studies (Cadet) training where he received a Diploma in Military Science and War Studies in Bonga, Ethiopia, Shield One.

In 1985, he graduated from the SPLA Institute of Revolutionary War Studies (Cadet) where he was commissioned with the rank of 2nd Lieutenant.

In 2020, he attended the senior command training on leadership and military transformation among other high-level military training.

Military experience, promotions, deployments, and achievements

Promotion 

 In 1983, served as a decipher clerk
 Sergeant in 1984
 Served as 2nd Lt. in 1985
 Served as 1st Lt. 1987 – 1991
 Served as Captain in 1992 – 1997
 Served as Alternate Commander and in 1997 he was promoted to the SPLA Rank of Commander. The rank he held up to July 2005 when the SPLA Military Ranking System was assessed and converted into a conventional military system.
 Brigadier General from 2005 – 2010
 In 2010, he was promoted to the rank of Major General.

References 

1959 births
2021 deaths
South Sudanese military personnel
People from Jonglei State
Deaths from the COVID-19 pandemic in South Sudan